Dry Wood Creek  is a stream in Bourbon County, Kansas and Vernon County, Missouri. It is a tributary of the Marmaton River. The confluence is approximately 1.5 miles northeast of Deerfield.

Dry Wood Creek was named for the dried-out wood that burned there during a period of drought, according to local history.

The Battle of Dry Wood Creek was fought on the Missouri side in 1861.

See also
List of rivers of Kansas
List of rivers of Missouri

References

Rivers of Bourbon County, Kansas
Rivers of Vernon County, Missouri
Rivers of Kansas
Rivers of Missouri